XSM is a three-letter acronym that may refer to:

 xsm is the default session manager for the X Window System
 XSM (Extra Silent Motor) is Panasonic's trade name for photo lens focusing technology using an ultrasonic motor
 XSM, or Ex-Simple Minds, the Scottish rock band
 XSM, or XSupermodels, a short-lived group of House of Pain member Danny Boy